Fennovoima Ltd is a nuclear power company established by Russian state's nuclear company Rosatom and a consortium of Finnish state-owned power and industrial companies.

The company does not own any nuclear capacities; however, it is preparing to build the 1200 MW Hanhikivi 1 nuclear power plant at Pyhäjoki.

Fennovoima Board 

The Chairman of Fennovoima's Board is Juhani Pitkäkoski, Senior Vice President of M&A of Caverion Corporation while the Vice Chairman is Anastasia Zoteeva, Deputy Director General for Business Development of Rusatom Energy International. Other board members are Esa Lager, former CFO of Outokumpu Plc; Juha Mäkitalo, Attorney-at-Law; Stefan Storholm, CEO of Katternö Group; Seppo Siljama, and CEO of Rusatom Energy International Nikita Konstantinov. 
Deputy Members of the Board are Ilkka Salonen, CEO of Garmoshka Ltd, Djurica Tankosic, President of Global Nuclear of Worley Parsons; Jussi Lehto, CEO of Keravan  and Pekka Erkkilä, Executive Vice President and Chief Technology Officer of Outokumpu.

Shareholders 
Finnish industry, trade and the energy companies in need of their own electricity production started the company in 2007. Originally Fennovoima was created as a partnership between Voimaosakeyhtiö SF, a cooperative producing electricity for its owners' needs at production cost in proportion to their ownership share (Mankala), with 66% and the German power company E.ON with 34%. After E.ON's withdrawal from Finland, Voimaosakeyhtiö SF briefly owned 100% of Fennovoima shares.  According to the agreement with Russian Rosatom, RAOS Voima Oy, a Finnish subsidiary of Rosatom, acquired a 34% stake which previously belonged to E.ON.  Although RAOS Voima was prepared to take 49% in the project, Voimaosakeyhtiö SF commits to own more than half of the power plant and aims to increase the share of Finnish companies up to 66%.  As of 2014, Voimaosakeyhtiö SF has 44 shareholders.

In 2016 Fennovoima is owned by Finnish Voimaosakeyhtiö SF (66%) and Rosatom's subsidiary RAOS Voima Oy (34%).
Voimaosakeyhtiö SF includes industrial and trading companies (mostly state-owned or state-controlled through Fortum and Solidium) as well as local energy utilities (which are mainly owned by municipalities).

Power plant project

On 21 April 2010, the Government of Finland decided to grant a permit (Decision-in-Principle) to Fennovoima for construction of a nuclear reactor.  The decision was approved by the Parliament on 1 July 2010. The estimated construction time is six years until 2024.

The chosen plant model is Rosatom's pressurized water reactor AES-2006 which is the latest evolution of VVER plant designs. The other bidders for the project were Areva and Toshiba.

Fennovoima began direct negotiations with Rosatom in April 2013. On 21 December 2013, Fennovoima and Rosatom Overseas, a subsidiary of Rosatom, signed a plant supply contract. The plant should be commissioned by 2024.

On 28 February 2014 Voimaosakeyhtiö SF made the final decision to participate in Fennovoima's nuclear power plant construction.  The final investment decision was to be made in 2014.

Fennovoima submitted an application at the end of June 2015 including the stakeholder with a 35 percent share of the Russian firm Rosatom and a percent share of Croatian power company Migrit Energija. In August 2015 the public was informed that  Migrit Solarna Energija would not be involved in the venture after it was reviewed to be owned by Sberbank Russia.

On 5 August 2015 Finnish Prime Minister Juha Sipilä said that the Fennovoima nuclear power plant will be approved. By then Finland’s third nuclear plant had attained the required 60 percent domestic or EU/EEA ownership level. The new share owners were energy giant Fortum with a 6.6 percent share and the construction firm SRV (which will be a building subcontractor on the site) with a 1.8 percent share, both of them via Voimaosakeyhtiö SF. Also steel manufacturer Outokumpu, whose steelworks in Tornio will be the biggest consumer of Fennovoima electricity, increased its ownership share by 1.8 percent to 14.1 percent. In May 2022, Fennovoima terminated its contract with Rosatom to build the power plant.

Criticism and financials 
 
In July 2015 less than a third of Finns supported a Fennovoima nuclear plant.

According to Greenpeace's critique, nuclear electricity is more expensive than alternatives. The company's financial plans assume the plant will be able to sell electricity at no more than 50 €/MWh across its lifetime, while the International Energy Agency estimates LCOE of 150 $/MWh for nuclear in the EU in 2020 (115 $/MWh in 2050), twice as expensive as offshore wind (75 $/MWh).

See also

Energy in Finland
Nuclear power in Finland

References

External links
 

Nuclear power companies of Finland